In the sport of athletics, centenarian competitors were recorded in the early 20th century, and have become increasingly common in the 21st century. This has occurred during a period of population ageing and increased longevity in wealthy countries, alongside a corresponding development of masters track and field competitions, such as the Senior Olympics and the World Masters Athletics Championships.
 
Stanisław Kowalski and Hidekichi Miyazaki at age 105 are two of the oldest centenarian masters track and field athletes. Orville Rogers (age 100) stated, “I love the thrill of preparation and training,” he told Runner’s World. “When I compete, I am not just running against the people out on the track at that moment, I am running against everyone who has run the event before me. That is gratifying to me.”

List of centenarians track and field athletes

American men and women

John Whittemore at age 104 is one of the oldest American centenarian men's masters track and field athlete. Julia Hawkins (age 105) competed in the 100 meter dash on Nov 6, 2021. The race was held at the Nov 6, 2021 Louisiana Senior Games at the Southeastern University’s track in Hammond, LA.

Numerous Centenarians have competed at the USATF Masters Outdoor Championships and the USATF Masters Indoor Championships. At the outdoor USA Championships, Orville Rogers (age 100 in 2018) and Julia "Hurricane" Hawkins (age 101 in 2017). At the indoor USA Championships Everett Hosack (ages 100 and 101) competed at the 2002 and 2003 meets, LeLand McPhie (age 100) at the 2014 meet, and Orville Rogers (100) and Julia “Hurricane” Hawkins (102) at the 2018 meet. As of 2020, no American centenarian have completed a combined event (decathlon or pentathlon).

The USATF (American) Centenarian Award is presented periodically to outstanding athletes 100 years old and above. In 2017 Julia Hawkins received the award.

Centenarian media coverage

 6 Feb 1995 Margaret White (age 100) was featured on Sports Illustrated (SI) that she competed at the Jan 29, 1995 Sooner State Games (indoor) in the shot put.
 21 Feb 1995 Margaret White was featured on The Jay Leno Show "as being the oldest shot-put person". She was also on The Phil Donahue Show.
 In 1998, Ben Levinson appeared on The Howie Mandel Show, CBS 48 Hours, and The Jay Leno Show after competing in the shot put at age 103.
 Everett Hosack (100) competed at the Penn Relays in 2002. Philadelphia Inquirer stated "... the oldest ever to run at the carnival [Penn Relay] ..." and "The crowd of 50,827 took to Hosack right away. He received a standing ovation ..." Later in 2002 Everett was a guest on The Jay Leno Show, "demonstrating his shot-putting prowess".
 In 2003, Waldo McBurney ran the 100 meter at the World Masters Athletic Championship in San Jose, Puerto Rico. The paper reports, "... he competes to show people you can still perform at an old age". In 2004 the Hayes Daily News reported that he published a book "My First 100 Years: A Look Back from the Finish Line".
 Santa Barbara Round Table reports John Whittemore, "Holds numerous Track & Field Records over 75-year-old Class". Book written by Art Linkletter states, "... Whittemore has been competing in track and field - and setting records since his boyhood ... was working out with weights daily and still thinking about new records".
 In 2015 Sports Illustrated (SI) reported, "100-year-old Frederick Winter of Holland, Mich., became the oldest man in National Senior Games history to complete the 100-meter dash".
 Ida Keeling appeared on an ESPN story, writer states "won't be stopping anytime soon".
 At the 2018 Masters National Indoor Track and Field Championship Orville Rogers (age 100) and Julia “Hurricane” Hawkins set 60 meter dash world records. Runner's World coverage stated, "Two Centenarians Steal the Show at USATF Masters Indoor Championships".
 June 2019 Express & Star news (out of Wolverhampton, England) reports, "At 103, Julia Hurricane Hawkins has cemented her title as the oldest woman to compete on an American track after finishing the 50- and 100 meter dashes at the National Senior Games in New Mexico".
 In 2020 BBC reports a story about the "Centenarian Olympics" featuring Julia "Hurricane" Hawkins and the benefits of continuing sports and other activities.

Centenarian videos

 In 2018 at the Masters National Indoor Track and Field Championship Orville Rogers (age 100) and Julia “Hurricane” Hawkins set 60 meter dash world records. Both of the races were aired by CNBC sports: (link)
 Polish athlete Stanislaw Kowalski (age 104) set a (former) record for the 60 meter dash. Facebook video: (link)
 Sept 2015 a Times of San Diego story and video on Don Pellmann's record setting week (five records). (Link)
 In 2016 NBC Sports captured Ida Keeling (age 100) competing in the Penn Relays. Short video: (Link)
 At the 2016 Pan American Games in Vancouver, Canada, Man Kaur (age 100) race was captured on YouTube: (Link) At the same meet, in a Sports Illustrated story "when she crossed the finish line in Vancouver, her competitors - many of them in their 70s and 80s - were there to cheer her on", and Five-time Olympian Charmain Crook refer to her stating "I know that it's inspired me".
 In 2019 ESPN featured Julia “Hurricane” Hawkins (age 103) in a short video: (link)

References

Further reading
Book: Masters Track and Field: A History by Leonard T Olson
Age is no barrier. 2011. Bryan Thomas. ISBN 978-0-9803191-1-8
Prospective Longevity: A New Vision of Population Aging, Pages 49 and 50

External links
Outdoor World Records
USATF Website: American Records
Masters History: List of US Records
US Convention Records Reports
Masters Rankings
Unofficial Single Age Records
Centenarians CNBC Video
Centenarians ESPN Story
Centenarians ESPN Story
Centenarians NBC Video
National Masters News
List of Olympic Centenarians
Age Group News

Centenarians
Centenarians
Centenarians